Cualac    is one of the 81 municipalities of Guerrero, in south-western Mexico. The municipal seat lies at Cualac.  The municipality covers an area of 196.8 km².

As of 2005, the municipality had a total population of 6,816.

References

Municipalities of Guerrero